Nicarete or Nicareta of Megara (Nikarétē) was a philosopher of the Megarian school, who flourished around . She is stated by Athenaeus to have been a hetaera of good family and education, and to have been a disciple of Stilpo. Diogenes Laërtius states that she was Stilpo's mistress, though he had a wife.

Notes

 

4th-century BC Greek people
Ancient Greek ethicists
Ancient Greek women philosophers
Ancient Megarians
Hetairai
Megarian philosophers
4th-century BC Greek women